Walter B. Edgar (born December 10, 1943) is an American historian and author specializing in Southern history and culture, particularly for South Carolina.  Edgar has authored or edited several books about the state, including South Carolina: A History and The South Carolina Encyclopedia.  He is known for hosting the popular weekly radio show Walter Edgar's Journal on South Carolina Public Radio on historic and cultural topics, as well as the daily feature South Carolina A to Z on South Carolina Public Radio.

Edgar was born in 1943 in Mobile, Alabama, and was raised there.  Edgar went to Davidson College in North Carolina for undergraduate studies, receiving a B.A. in history.  Edgar elected to continue history studies at the University of South Carolina, graduating with both a masters and doctorate degree.  Following active duty in the U.S. Army including a tour in Vietnam, Edgar returned to USC as a professor in 1972 while remaining in the Army Reserve, from which he retired as a colonel.  He retired from USC after 40 years of teaching and research in 2012.  Edgar was married to his first wife Betty in 1966.  She died in 2005 following health complications.  Edgar remarried in 2007 to his current wife Nela; they live in Columbia, SC.

Works
 
 , a pictorial volume
 new introduction and two new appendices by Walter B. Edgar in  originally published 1941

References

Living people
1943 births
21st-century American historians
American male non-fiction writers
Historians of South Carolina
Historians of the United States
Writers from Mobile, Alabama
Writers from Columbia, South Carolina
United States Army officers
21st-century American male writers